Michael Dowse (born April 19, 1973) is a Canadian director.

Life and career
Born in London, Ontario, to Irish parents, he was trained as a film editor. His first full-length movie, FUBAR was shot on a digital camera with a tiny budget, but was selected by the Sundance Film Festival and screened on the prestigious midnight slot, which had launched the revolutionary film The Blair Witch Project. Though it failed to get picked up by any major American theatrical distributors, FUBAR subsequently became a cult hit in Canada. Following the success of FUBAR, Dowse went on to direct the higher-budget British film It's All Gone Pete Tong, the story of a deaf DJ in Ibiza.

Dowse's next production, the 1980s retro comedy Take Me Home Tonight, started shooting in Phoenix, Arizona on the week beginning 19 February 2007, and was released to theaters on March 4, 2011.

Dowse directed The F Word, starring Daniel Radcliffe, Zoe Kazan, and Adam Driver.

He has also directed Stuber, starring Dave Bautista, Kumail Nanjiani, and Iko Uwais. A film about an encounter between an Uber driver and an almost-blind cop.

He currently resides in Montreal with his wife and children.

Filmography

Film

Short films

Television

Music videos

Other credits

Awards and nominations

References

External links

It's All Gone Pete Tong Official Film Website
FUBAR - The Movie Official Film Website

1973 births
Living people
Canadian people of Irish descent
Film directors from London, Ontario